Antiquesportfolio.com plc v Rodney Fitch & Co Ltd ([2001] FSR 345) is a case in British copyright law that dealt in implied contractual obligations to avoid violating copyright, and on the copyright status of photographs.

Action
The plaintiff, Antiquesportfolio.com, wished to set up a business, operating over the internet, to sell antiques, and had contracted with the defendant, Rodney Fitch, to create its website, business cards, logos, and advertising literature.  Antiquesportfolio.com sued after it discovered that several of the images used by Fitch were copies of photographs that were in Miller's Antiques & Encyclopaedia, an encyclopaedia of antiques. It alleged that Fitch had breached an implied term of the contract, namely the supply of a website that didn't violate another party's copyrights, sought the repayment of all monies paid, and moved for summary judgement.  Fitch counterclaimed for all monies owed.

Judgement 
The court had to address four issues in its judgement: whether an implied term existed, whether the images in the encyclopaedia were copyrightable, whether copyright had been infringed, and which party (if any) should pay the other.

Lord Justice Neuberger held, partly in reliance upon Lister v Romford Ice and Cold Storage Company, that there was an implied term in the contract between the two parties, for the goods supplied to be fit for the purpose for which they were commissioned.  This comprised a duty of reasonable care on the part of Rodney Fitch to not use material that was knowingly copied from a third party.  He further found that photographs of three-dimensional objects may be copyrightable.

References

Further reading 
 
 

United Kingdom copyright case law
2001 in case law
2001 in British law
High Court of Justice cases